Hawkwind in Your Area is the twenty-second live/studio album by the English space rock group Hawkwind.

The live side was recorded during the group's 1997 tour to promote the Distant Horizons album. The studio tracks were recorded during 1998.

The group had ceased business dealings with former manager Douglas Smith who had been running the record label Emergency Broadcast System Records, and as a consequence found themselves without an outlet in Europe for their recordings. They had, however, a long-standing deal with Griffin Music in North America for licensing the EBS material, so this album received a North American release in January 1999, but no European equivalent. Later, in 2000, as Brock started to make archive material available for release in the UK through Voiceprint Records, it received a belated UK release.

Track listing
"Brainstorm" (Nik Turner) / "Hawkwind In Your Area" (Dave Brock, Captain Rizz) / "Alchemy" (Richards, Chadwick) – 11:08
"Love in Space" (Brock) – 2:46
"Rat Race" (Brock, Rizz) – 5:51
"Aerospace Age Inferno" (Robert Calvert) – 5:32
"First Landing on Medusa" (Calvert, Brock) – 1:41
"I Am the Reptoid" (Tree) – 3:19
"The Nazca" (Brock) – 0:44
"Hippy" (Tree, Richards) – 5:45
"Prairie" (Tree, Richards) – 2:39
"Your Fantasy" (Tree, Brock, Chadwick, Richards) – 5:04
"Luxotica" (Tree, Chadwick, Richards) – 3:09
"Diana Park" (Brock) – 4:21

Personnel
Hawkwind
Dave Brock – electric guitar, keyboards, vocals
Jerry Richards – electric guitar
Ron Tree – vocals, bass guitar
Richard Chadwick – drums
with:
Captain Rizz – vocals
Crum (Julian Crimmins) – keyboards

Credits
Tracks 1-6 recorded live at Ancienne Belgique, Brussels, Belgium – 20 November 1997

Release history
1999: Griffin Music, GCD740-2, USA
2000: Voiceprint, HAWKVP17CD, UK

References

1999 albums
Hawkwind albums